Ayokunmi Christopher Oluwaseun Banjo (born February 26, 1990) is a former American football safety and current assistant special teams coach for the Denver Broncos of the National Football League (NFL). He played college football at SMU. Banjo was signed by the Jacksonville Jaguars as an undrafted free agent in 2013. He has also played for the Green Bay Packers, New Orleans Saints, and Arizona Cardinals.

College career

Banjo attended Southern Methodist University, where he played on the SMU Mustangs football team from 2008 to 2011.

Statistics

Professional playing career

Jacksonville Jaguars
After going undrafted in the 2012 NFL Draft, Banjo signed with the Jacksonville Jaguars on April 18, 2013. On July 25, 2013, he was released by the Jaguars.

Green Bay Packers
On July 29, 2013, Banjo was signed by the Green Bay Packers.

He was re-signed by the Packers on February 26, 2014. On August 30, 2014, Banjo was released by the Packers during final team cuts. He was signed to the Packers' practice squad the following day. On December 13, 2014, Banjo was promoted from the practice squad to the active roster.

He was re-signed by the Packers on March 10, 2015. Banjo was elected by teammates as a playoff captain after leading the team in special teams tackles in the 2015 season.

On March 8, 2016, Banjo was re-signed by the Packers. He was placed on injured reserve on October 24, 2016. On October 31, 2016, Banjo was waived by the Packers after reaching an injury settlement.

New Orleans Saints
On November 15, 2016, Banjo was signed by the New Orleans Saints. On March 7, 2017, Banjo signed a two-year contract extension with the Saints.

On March 9, 2019, Banjo signed a three-year contract extension with the Saints. He was released on August 31, 2019.

Arizona Cardinals
On September 25, 2019, Banjo was signed by the Arizona Cardinals.

On April 2, 2020, Banjo was re-signed by the Cardinals. He was placed on the reserve/COVID-19 list by the team on December 31, 2020, and activated on January 5, 2021.

On March 31, 2021, Banjo was re-signed by the Cardinals to a one-year contract. He was released on August 31, 2021 and re-signed to the practice squad the next day. He was promoted to the active roster on October 4, 2021.

On September 29, 2022, Banjo was signed to the Arizona Cardinals practice squad after going unsigned in the offseason. He was signed to the active roster on October 12.

On February 26, 2023, Banjo's 33rd birthday, he announced his retirement from the NFL after 10 seasons in a post on his Twitter account.

NFL career statistics

Professional coaching career
The Denver Broncos announced the hiring of Banjo as an assistant special teams coach under new head coach Sean Payton on February 25, 2023.

Personal life
Banjo was born to Nigerian parents who migrated to Houston. His mother died in 2010.

His name "Oluwaseun" means "We thank God" in Yoruba.

References

External links

 Green Bay Packers bio
 Jacksonville Jaguars bio
 SMU Mustangs bio
 

1990 births
Living people
American sportspeople of Nigerian descent
American people of Yoruba descent
Yoruba sportspeople
Players of American football from Houston
People from Sugar Land, Texas
American football safeties
SMU Mustangs football players
Jacksonville Jaguars players
Green Bay Packers players
New Orleans Saints players
Arizona Cardinals players